Ixorhea is a genus of flowering plants belonging to the family Boraginaceae.

Its native range is Northwestern Argentina.

Species:
 Ixorhea tschudiana Fenzl

References

Boraginaceae
Boraginaceae genera